The 2021 Skrewball Peanut Butter Whiskey 200 at The Glen was the 20th stock car race of the 2021 NASCAR Xfinity Series, and the 27th iteration of the event. The event was held on Saturday, August 7, 2021, in Watkins Glen, New York at Watkins Glen International, a  permanent road course. The race took 82 laps to complete. Ty Gibbs, running a part time schedule for Joe Gibbs Racing, would win his 3rd race of the year and of his career for the series. A. J. Allmendinger of Kaulig Racing and Austin Cindric of Team Penske would score the rest of the podium positions, scoring 2nd and 3rd, respectively.

Background 
Watkins Glen International (nicknamed "The Glen") is an automobile race track located in Watkins Glen, New York at the southern tip of Seneca Lake. It was long known around the world as the home of the Formula One United States Grand Prix, which it hosted for twenty consecutive years (1961–1980), but the site has been home to road racing of nearly every class, including the World Sportscar Championship, Trans-Am, Can-Am, NASCAR Sprint Cup Series, the International Motor Sports Association and the IndyCar Series.

Initially, public roads in the village were used for the race course. In 1956 a permanent circuit for the race was built. In 1968 the race was extended to six hours, becoming the 6 Hours of Watkins Glen. The circuit's current layout has more or less been the same since 1971, although a chicane was installed at the uphill Esses in 1975 to slow cars through these corners, where there was a fatality during practice at the 1973 United States Grand Prix. The chicane was removed in 1985, but another chicane called the "Inner Loop" was installed in 1992 after J.D. McDuffie's fatal accident during the previous year's NASCAR Winston Cup event.

The circuit is known as the Mecca of North American road racing and is a very popular venue among fans and drivers. The facility is currently owned by International Speedway Corporation.

Entry list

Starting lineup 
The starting lineup was determined by a formula based on the previous race, the 2021 Ambetter Get Vaccinated 200. As a result, Justin Allgaier won the pole.

Race results 
Stage 1 Laps: 20

Stage 2 Laps: 20

Stage 3 Laps: 42

References 

2021 NASCAR Xfinity Series
NASCAR races at Watkins Glen International
Skrewball Peanut Butter Whiskey 200 at The Glen
Skrewball Peanut Butter Whiskey 200 at The Glen